Church Island ("big island") is an island in Lough Gill, Ireland.

The island

It is believed by locals that this island is the one referred to in Yeats poem, The Lake Isle of Inishfree, as the actual Inishfree island is too small to be inhabited and does not line up with his description. Former staff members of the nearby Clogherevagh House back up this story by recalling Yeats visits to the house and frequent trips to Church Island.

Church 
The church is said to have been founded by Lommán of Trim.
The church on Church Island is National Monument #118.

It is an early Christian ruin and belonged to the Ó Ruairc, rulers of Bréifne. The building is oblong, has loophole windows and a recess at one end. Near the door there is a cavity in a rock, known as ‘lady's bed’, which was a frequent place of pilgrimage for pregnant woman. In 1416, according to the Annals, ‘The church of Inis Mor, in Lough Gill, was burned; and Screaptra ui Chuirnin [O'Curnin's manuscripts], and the Leabhar Gearr of the O'Cuirnins, as well as many other precious articles, were burned also.’

References

External links

Islands of County Sligo
Uninhabited islands of Ireland
River islands of Ireland